Rawa  is a village in the administrative district of Gmina Michów, within Lubartów County, Lublin Voivodeship, in eastern Poland.

The village has a population of 242.

References

Rawa